These are the results of the 2007 South American Championships in Athletics which took place from June 7 through June 9, 2007 in São Paulo, Brazil.  The list was compiled from various sources and is still incomplete, especially concerning details of the field events.

Men's results

100 meters

Heat 1 – 8 June – Wind: -0.8 m/s

Heat 2 – 8 June – Wind: -0.8 m/s

Final – 8 June – Wind: -0.7 m/s

200 meters

Heat 1 – 9 June – Wind: +1.3 m/s

Heat 2 – 9 June – Wind: +0.8 m/s

Heat 3 – 9 June – Wind: +0.7 m/s

Final – 9 June – Wind: +0.4 m/s

400 meters

Heat 1 – 7 June

Heat 2 – 7 June

Final – 8 June

800 meters
Final – 8 June

1500 meters
Final – 9 June

5000 meters
Final – 7 June

10,000 meters
Final – 8 June

3000 meters steeplechase
Final – 9 June

110 meters hurdles

Heat 1 – 7 June – Wind: +0.2 m/s

Heat 2 – 7 June – Wind: +0.3 m/s

Final – 7 June – Wind: -0.8 m/s

400 meters hurdles

Heat 1 – 8 June

Heat 1 – 8 June

Final – 9 June

High jump
Final – 8 June

Pole vault
Final – 7 June

Long jump
Final – 7 June

Triple jump
Final – 9 June

Shot put
Final – 7 June

Discus throw
Final – 8 June

Hammer throw
Final – 8 June

Javelin throw
Final – 7 June

Decathlon
7/8 June

20,000 meters walk
Final – 8 June

4 x 100 meters relay
Final – 8 June

4 x 400 meters relay
Final – 9 June

Women's results

100 meters

Heat 1 – 7 June – Wind: -0.2 m/s

Heat 2 – 7 June – Wind: +0.3 m/s

Final – 7 June – Wind: +0.2 m/s

200 meters

Heat 1 – 9 June – Wind: +1.4 m/s

Heat 2 – 9 June – Wind: +0.8 m/s

Final – 9 June – Wind: -0.5 m/s

400 meters
Final – 8 June

800 meters
Final – 8 June

1500 meters
Final – 9 June

5000 meters
Final – 7 June

10,000 meters
Final – 9 June

3000 meters steeplechase
Final – 8 June

100 meters hurdles

Heat 1 – 7 June – Wind: +0.0 m/s

Heat 2 – 7 June – Wind: +0.1 m/s

Final – 7 June – Wind: +0.0 m/s

400 meters hurdles
Final – 9 June

High jump
Final – 9 June

Pole vault
Final – 9 June

Long jump
Final – 8 June

Triple jump
Final – 9 June

Shot put
Final – 8 June

Discus throw
Final – 7 June

Hammer throw
Final – 9 June

Javelin throw
Final – 9 June

Heptathlon
8/9 June

20,000 meters walk
Final – 7 June

4 x 100 meters relay
Final – 8 June

4 x 400 meters relay
Final – 9 June

References

South America
Events at the South American Championships in Athletics